Blackley is a toponymic surname that refers to the suburban area of Manchester. Notable people with the surname include:

Adam Blackley (born 1985), Australian baseball player
Charles Harrison Blackley (1820–1900), English physician
Jamie Blackley (born 1991), British actor
Jim Blackley (born 1927), Scottish-born Canadian jazz drummer
John Blackley (born 1948), Scottish footballer and manager
John Blackley (politician) (1862–1952), Australian politician
Len Blackley (1915–1983), Australian rules footballer
Seamus Blackley, American video game designer
Travis Blackley (born 1982), Australian baseball player

English toponymic surnames